Qualcomm Gobi is a family of embedded mobile broadband modem products by Qualcomm. Gobi technology 2 was designed to allow for any product with the embedded solution to connect to the internet anywhere a wireless carrier provides data coverage. One of the more notable products that contain a Gobi modem is the iPhone 4 for Verizon, which contains a MDM6600, however it does not take advantage of the support for HSPA+.

History 
On October 23, 2007, Qualcomm announced the first set of Gobi-enabled chipsets to be commercially available in the second quarter of 2008.
The first chip produced by Qualcomm, the MDM1000, gained support from PC manufacturer HP 
as well as wireless carriers Vodafone and Verizon.

Two years later, on February 11, 2009, Qualcomm announced the second generation of Gobi-enabled chipsets, the MDM2000. The MDM2000 added support for additional frequencies which are prevalent in Japan and rural Europe, improved uplink capabilities and other software upgrades.

The third, and most recent, generation of Gobi-enabled chipsets was announced on March 23, 2010 however this generation consists of a total of 6 different chips which support different ranges of wireless standards and data rates. The reasoning behind the multiple chips was to address additional markets such as USB modems, e-readers, gaming devices and machine to machine commercial applications. 
Qualcomm also introduced software enhancements for select Mobile Data Modem (MDM) chipsets that enabled “a common Gobi software interface (API) across multiple hardware platforms.”

Products 

The main feature of the Gobi modems is their support of multiple wireless standards such as GSM and CDMA. Newer modems also have support for 4G wireless standards such as HSPA+ and LTE, with a notable omission of WiMax.
The extensive support of wireless standards allows consumers to choose between multiple carriers based on the modem present in their device. What standard the modem supports and at what rates depends on the chip being used.

Below is a list of Gobi-enabled modem chipsets released by Qualcomm and their features:

MDM1000:
Multi-mode modem
EV-DO Rev. A support (CDMA)
800, 1900 MHz
HSPA support with full backward compatibility with GSM, GPRS and EDGE
850, 1900, 2100 MHz for HSPA
850, 900, 1800, 1900 MHz for GSM/GPRS/EDGE
Simultaneous GPS functionality
MDM2000:
All the features of the MDM1000
Support for HSPA at 800 and 900 MHz
Improved upload speeds for HSPA
Improved GPS functionality, including support for Assisted GPS
MDM6200:
Single-mode modem
Only supports HSPA+  with data rates of up to 14.4 Mbit/s
GPS functionality, including support for Assisted GPS
MDM6600:
Multi-mode modem
HSPA+ with data rates of up to 14.4 Mbit/s
CDMA2000 1xEV-DO Rev. A/Rev. B support
GPS functionality, including support for Assisted GPS
MDM8200A: 
Single-mode modem
Only supports HSPA+ with data rates of up to 28 Mbit/s
GPS functionality, including support for Assisted GPS
MDM8220:
Single-mode modem
Only supports Dual-Carrier HSPA+ with data rates of up to 42 Mbit/s
GPS functionality, including support for Assisted GPS
MDM9200:
Single-mode modem
4G(LTE) data rates of up to 100 Mbit/s with full backward compatibility to Dual-Carrier HSPA+
GPS functionality, including support for Assisted GPS
MDM9600:
Multi-mode modem
4G (LTE) data rates of up to 100 Mbit/s with full backward compatibility to Dual-Carrier HSPA+
EV-DO Rev. A/Rev. B support
GPS functionality, including support for Assisted GPS

Model Names and Real World Names

Awards 
Mobile Innovation Awards - Mobile Computing – LAPTOP Magazine.

See also 
Comparison of wireless data standards
Qualcomm Snapdragon
Qualcomm Snapdragon LTE modem

References

External links 
 Gobi Homepage - 

Qualcomm
Modem
Modems